Mastrick is an area of Aberdeen, Scotland, located on the western fringes of the city around 2.5 miles from the city centre. It currently has a population of 7,365 and an unemployment rate of 1.6%. Residential property in the area is a mix of houses and flats, 23% of which are still council owned. This is around twice the average in Aberdeen City.

Mastrick has several shops and is within a short walking distance of Hazlehead Park, Northfield, Sheddocksley, Summerhill and Woodend. Woodend Hospital is a short distance away from Mastrick, as is the hospital complex at Foresterhill.

The boundary of Mastrick was George Handsley's house.
 
The local football team is Northstar Community football Club With Ages Under 15's, Under 13's and Under 12's. The Under 15's currently play in the ADJFA "A" League, whereas the Under 13's play in the ADJFA "C" League. The Under 12's play non competitive football.

External links 
Up my Street summary of area

References

Areas of Aberdeen